West Dulwich railway station is on the Chatham Main Line in England, serving the West Dulwich area in the London Borough of Southwark, south London. The station and all services are operated by Southeastern.

History 

The station was opened as "Dulwich" in the same year. The prefix "West" was added in 1926.
The local area was flooded after the Dulwich Estate lost a court case in which they claimed part of the station was part of their network of drainage canals.

Services 
All services at West Dulwich are operated by Southeastern, using  and  EMUs.

The typical off-peak service in trains per hour is:
 2 tph to 
 2 tph to  via 

During the peak hours, additional services between London Victoria and Bromley South call at the station increasing the service to 4 tph in each direction. Furthermore, from December 2022, some peak services go to London Blackfriars in order to provide connectivity to the City of London, with some returning from Blackfriars in the afternoon.

Connections
London Buses route P13 serves the station, with nearby bus stop Croxted Road/Thurlow Park Road serving London Buses route 3 and London Buses route 201, as well as night route London Buses route N3.

The station is located 5 miles away from London Victoria station.

References

External links 

Dulwich
Railway stations in the London Borough of Southwark
Former London, Chatham and Dover Railway stations
Railway stations in Great Britain opened in 1863
Railway stations served by Southeastern